Selvazzano Dentro is a comune (municipality) in the province of Padua, Veneto, northeast Italy, located about  west of Venice and about  southwest of Padua.

References

External links
 Official website

Cities and towns in Veneto